Sangharsha is a 2007 Bengali film directed by Sujit Guha and produced by Naresh Kumar. The film features actors Prosenjit Chatterjee, Swastika Mukherjee, Sayantani Ghosh, Rajatava Dutta, in the lead roles. Music of the film has been composed by Malay Ganguly. It is a remake of the 2006 film Lakshmi starring Venkatesh, Nayantara and Charmme Kaur.

Cast 
 Prosenjit Chatterjee as Bijoy Dev
 Swastika Mukherjee as Nandini
 Sayantani Ghosh as Anjali, Bijoy's PA
 Rajatava Dutta as Janardhan, the main antagonist
 Mrinal Mukherjee as Baga, the local don of North Bengal, the secondary antagonist
 Subhasish Mukherjee as Man who came to Bijoy's company for demanding money
 Anuradha Ray as Bijoy's mother
Ratan Lakhmani as Prasad Dev, Bijoy's younger brother
 Rishi Mukherjee as Bijoy's brother-in-law
 Puja Gangopadhyay as Chandra, Bijoy's sister
 Premjit as Vyas Dev, Bijoy's brother
 Dola Chowdhury as Sathi, Bijoy's sister

 Diganta Bagchi as Raghav, Baga's son & psycho obsessive lover of Nandini
Tanveer Khan as Suresh, Bijoy's brother-in-law &  Janardhan's son
 Sumit Ganguly as Babuji, a local goon of Kolkata
 Ramen Roy Chowdhury as Bijoy's father

Soundtrack
Music of the film was composed by Malay Ganguly. Lyrics of the album were penned by Gautam Susmit. Babul Supriyo, Alka Yagnik, Sadhana Sargam, Shaan, Shreya Ghoshal, Miss Jojo had given their voices for the album.

References

External links
 
 http://www.gomolo.com/celeb/swastika-mukherjee-and-prosenjit-movies-list/1209/10367

Bengali-language Indian films
2006 films
2000s Bengali-language films
Bengali remakes of Telugu films